Emotion work is understood as the art of trying to change in degree or quality an emotion or feeling.

Emotion work may be defined as the management of one's own feelings, or work done in an effort to maintain a relationship; there is dispute as to whether emotion work is only work done regulating one’s own emotion, or extends to performing the emotional work for others.

Hochschild

Arlie Russell Hochschild, who introduced the term in 1979, distinguished emotion work – unpaid emotional work that a person undertakes in private life  – from emotional labor: emotional work done in a paid work setting. Emotion work has use value and occurs in situations in which people choose to regulate their emotions for their own non-compensated benefit (e.g., in their interactions with family and friends). By contrast, emotional labor has exchange value because it is traded and performed for a wage.

In a later development, Hochschild distinguished between two broad types of emotion work, and among three techniques of emotion work. The two broad types involve evocation and suppression of emotion, while the three techniques of emotion work that Hochschild describes are cognitive, bodily and expressive.

However, the concept (if not the term) has been traced back as far as Aristotle: as Aristotle saw, the problem is not with emotionality, but with the appropriateness of emotion and its expression.

Examples

Examples of emotion work include showing affection, apologizing after an argument, bringing up problems that need to be addressed in an intimate relationship or any kind of interpersonal relationship, and making sure the household runs smoothly.

Emotion work also involves the orientation of self/others to accord with accepted norms of emotional expression: emotion work is often performed by family members and friends, who put pressure on individuals to conform to emotional norms. Arguably, then, an individual's ultimate obeisance and/or resistance to aspects of emotion regimes are made visible in their emotion work.

Cultural norms often imply that emotion work is reserved for females. There is certainly evidence to the effect that the emotional management that women and men do is asymmetric; and that in general, women come into a marriage groomed for the role of emotional manager.

Criticism
The social theorist Victor Jeleniewski Seidler argues that women's emotion work is merely another demonstration of false consciousness under patriarchy, and that emotion work, as a concept, has been adopted, adapted or criticized to such an extent that it is in danger of becoming a "catch-all-cliché".

More broadly, the concept of emotion work has itself been criticized as a wide over-simplification of mental processes such as repression and denial which continually occur in everyday life.

Literary analogues
Rousseau in The New Heloise suggests that the attempt to master instrumentally one's affective life always results in a weakening and eventually the fragmentation of one's identity, even if the emotion work is performed at the demand of ethical principles.

See also

References

Further reading 
 

Emotion
Emotional issues
Life skills